SKZ-Replay is the third compilation album by South Korean boy band Stray Kids. It was released digitally on December 21, 2022, through JYP Entertainment and Republic Records. Consisting of 25 tracks, the album split into two sides: the A-side contains ten songs, eight performed solo and two performed by the group as a whole, and the B-side includes fifteen original songs from their video series SKZ-Player and SKZ-Record.

Background

Stray Kids released the video series SKZ-Player and SKZ-Record to showcase their self-written songs and covers, as well as other non-promotional projects published unofficially on various online video platforms. SKZ-Player was released as music videos, while SKZ-Record was released as audio-only videos. The first video from the SKZ-Player series was Lee Know, Hyunjin, and Felix's choreography video, uploaded on August 26, 2018. The first video of SKZ-Record was Seungmin's cover of "Start Over", originally performed by Gaho for the television series Itaewon Class, published on May 4, 2020. "Fam" was originally recorded in Japanese and included on Stray Kids' debut Japanese-language EP All In, released on November 4, 2020. The music video for the unreleased track "#LoveStay" was uploaded on December 31, 2021, as a tribute to the group's fans, collectively called "Stay".

Release and promotion

On January 1, 2022, JYP Entertainment uploaded the video "Step Out 2022", which outlined Stray Kids' accomplishments in 2021 and goals for the new year, including plans for an album that collected songs from the SKZ-Player and SKZ-Record series. At their "Seoul Special (Unveil 11)" show of Maniac World Tour on September 17, the group debuted the Korean version of "Fam" during the encore. On November 9, Stray Kids revealed the souvenirs for the third-generation official fan club recruitment, including a promotional CD for the album titled SKZ-Replay. They stated that the album would be released digitally in December 2022 and consist of an A and B-side; the CD would contain only songs from the A-side. One month later, on December 14, SKZ-Replay was formally announced for release on December 21. The track listing was revealed over the following two days. It consists of 25 tracks, including eight new tracks performed as solos by each member, besides the previously published tracks. An accompanying music video for the Korean version of "Fam" was also uploaded on the same day as the album's release.

Track listing

Notes
  Versachoi and Taalthechoi are different pseudonyms for the same person.

Credits and personnel

Musicians

 Bang Chan (3Racha) – vocals (A-side: 1, 2, 10; B-side: 1, 3, 4, 7, 13, 14), all instruments (A-side: 1, 2, 4–6, 9; B-side: 1–5, 7–12, 14, 15), computer programming (A-side: 2, 4–6, 10; B-side: 1–5, 7–12, 14, 15)
 Lee Know – vocals (A-side: 1, 3, 10; B-side: 14)
 Changbin (3Racha) – vocals (A-side: 1, 4, 10; B-side: 1, 3, 7, 9, 10, 13)
 Hyunjin – vocals (A-side: 1, 5, 10; B-side: 6, 15), background vocals (B-side: 6), vocal directing (B-side: 6)
 Han (3Racha) – vocals (A-side: 1, 6, 10; B-side: 1, 2, 5, 8, 11, 12)
 Felix – vocals (A-side: 1, 7, 10; B-side: 9, 13)
 Seungmin – vocals (A-side: 1, 8, 10; B-side: 10, 13), background vocals (A-side: 8)
 I.N – vocals (A-side: 1, 9, 10; B-side: 7)
 Ekko – chorus (A-side: 3)
 Versachoi / Taalthechoi – all instruments (A-side: 1, 2), computer programming (A-side: 1, 2, 13)
 HotSauce – piano (A-side: 3), computer programming (A-side: 3)
 Kim Wang-joon – bass (A-side: 3)
 Bang In-jae – guitar (A-side: 3)
 Millionboy – all instruments (A-side: 4), computer programming (A-side: 4)
 Nickko Young – all instruments (A-side: 5, 9), computer programming (A-side: 9)
 Shim Eun-jee – piano (A-side: 7), vocal directing (A-side: 7)
 Hong Ji-sang – electric guitar (A-side: 8), bass (A-side: 8), piano (A-side: 8), computer programming (A-side: 8)
 Semi Kim – keyboard (A-side: 10), bass (A-side: 10), string (A-side: 10), computer programming (A-side: 10)
 Bush – bass (B-side: 6), synthesizer (B-side: 6), computer programming (B-side: 6)
 Ra Kyung-oe – guitar (B-side: 6)
 Nok – piano (B-side: 6)
 Nick Lee – all instruments (B-side: 13)
 Josh Wei – all instruments (B-side: 13)

Technical

 Lee Kyeong-won – digital editing (A-side: 1, 5, 9, 10)
 Bang Chan (3Racha) – digital editing (A-side: 2, 4, 6; B-side: 1–5, 7–15), recording (A-side: 1, 2, 4, 6; B-side: 1–5, 7–15), mixing (B-side: 4)
 HotSauce – digital editing (A-side: 3)
 Bush – digital editing (B-side: 6)
 Shim Eun-jee – digital editing (A-side: 7), vocal editing (A-side: 7)
 Nick Lee – digital editing (B-side: 13)
 Josh Wei – digital editing (B-side: 13)
 Lee Sang-yeop – recording (A-side: 1, 9), mixing (A-side: 9)
 Lim Chan-mi – recording (A-side: 3)
 Park Eun-jung – recording (A-side: 5)
 Seo Eun-il – recording (A-side: 5)
 Goo Hye-jin – recording (A-side: 7, 10)
 Hong Ji-sang – recording (A-side: 8)
 Hyunjin – recording (B-side: 6)
 Shin Bong-won – mixing (A-side: 1, 3)
 Yoon Won-kwon – mixing (A-side: 2, 5, 7; B-side: 1, 7, 14)
 Stay Tuned – mixing (A-side: 4; B-side: 5, 8, 12)
 Lim Hong-jin – mixing (A-side: 6, 10; B-side: 6, 9, 10)
 Lee Tae-sub – mixing (A-side: 8; B-side: 15)
 Master Key – mixing (B-side: 2, 3, 11)
 Sam Sherbin – mixing (B-side: 13)
 Park Nam-joon – engineering (A-side: 1, 3)
 Park Jung-eon – mastering (A-side: 1)
 Kwon Nam-woo – mastering (A-side: 2–10; B-side: all)

Locations

 JYP Publishing (KOMCA) – publishing (all), sub-publishing (B-side: 13)
 Copyright Control – publishing (A-side: 9, 10)
 Atlas Music Group (ASCAP) – publishing (B-side: 13)
 Sumowhaleboy (ASCAP) – publishing (B-side: 13)
 Snakeweed Studios LLP – publishing (B-side: 13)
 Peermusic (UK) – sub-publishing (B-side: 13)
 Universal Music Publishing Korea – sub-publishing (B-side: 13)
 Channie's "Room" – recording (A-side: 1, 2, 4, 6; B-side: 1–5, 7–15), mixing (B-side: 4)
 JYPE Studios – recording (A-side: 1, 3, 5, 7, 9, 10; B-side: 6, 9, 10), mixing (A-side: 6, 8–10; B-side: 6, 9, 10, 15)
 Jisang's Studio – recording (A-side: 8)
 GLAB Studios – mixing (A-side: 1, 3), engineering (A-side: 1, 3)
 Studio DDeepKick – mixing (A-side: 2, 5, 7; B-side: 1, 7, 14)
 Stay Tuned Studio – mixing (A-side: 4; B-side: 5, 8, 12)
 821 Sound – mixing (B-side: 2, 3, 11), mastering (A-side: 2–10; B-side: all)
 SonicsScents Studio – mixing (B-side: 13)
 Honey Butter Studio – mastering (A-side: 1)

Charts

Release history

References

2022 compilation albums
JYP Entertainment albums
Korean-language compilation albums
Republic Records compilation albums
Stray Kids albums